The Charles Foote House is located in Pine Valley, Wisconsin.

History
Charles Foote was a Civil War veteran, town treasurer, and member of the Clark County Agricultural Society. The house was added to both the State and the National Register of Historic Places in 1997.

References

Houses on the National Register of Historic Places in Wisconsin
National Register of Historic Places in Clark County, Wisconsin
Houses in Clark County, Wisconsin
Farmhouses in the United States
Italianate architecture in Wisconsin
Brick buildings and structures